The Light flyweight competition was the lightest class featured at the 2011 World Amateur Boxing Championships, held at the Heydar Aliyev Sports and Exhibition Complex.

Medalists

Seeds

  Salman Alizade (third round)
  Shin Jong-Hun (runner-up)
  Pürevdorjiin Serdamba (semifinals)
  David Ayrapetyan (semifinals)
  José de la Nieve (quarterfinals)
  Hovhannes Danielyan (second round)
  Carlos Quipo (third round)
  Paddy Barnes (second round)

Draw

Finals

Top Half

Section 1

Section 2

Bottom Half

Section 3

Section 4

External links
Draw

Light flyweight